Callam is both a surname and a given name. Notable people with the name include:

Dave Callam (born 1983), Scottish rugby union player
Neville Callam, Jamaican Baptist theologian
Callam Jones (born 1996), English footballer

See also
Callum
Hallam (surname)